Bentley Wimble (9 June 1864 – 2 September 1927) was a South African first-class cricketer. He played for Transvaal in the 1889–90 Currie Cup.

References

External links
 

1864 births
1927 deaths
South African cricketers
Gauteng cricketers
People from Graaff-Reinet
Cricketers from the Eastern Cape